Ernst Jõesaar (18 July 1905 Konguta, Tartu County – 10 November 1985 Stockholm) was an Estonian sculptor.

In 1933 he graduated from Pallas Art School. In 1944 he escaped to Sweden and started to live in Stockholm.

Works

 1937: figurative composition "Agriculture"
 1938: monument "H. Mugasto"
 1938: portrait "S. Leitu"
 1939: portrait "O. Kangilaski"
 1939: figurative composition "Man and Horse"
 1968: relief "Remembrance"

References

1905 births
1985 deaths
20th-century Estonian sculptors
20th-century Estonian male artists
Estonian World War II refugees
People from Elva Parish
Estonian emigrants to Sweden